Kenneth David Raffensberger (August 8, 1917 – November 10, 2002) was an American starting pitcher in Major League Baseball (MLB). From 1939 through 1954, he played for the St. Louis Cardinals (1939), Chicago Cubs (1940–41), Philadelphia Phillies (1943–47), and Cincinnati Reds/Redlegs (1947–54). Raffensberger batted right-handed and threw left-handed.

Career
In a 15-season big league career, Raffensberger posted a win–loss record of 119–154 with 806 strikeouts and a 3.60 earned run average (ERA) in  innings pitched. His career winning percentage was .463, despite being an all-star and having an above average career ERA (3.60).

Raffensberger started his career as a fastball pitcher, particularly gaining success with his rising fastball. However, further along in his career (beginning in the early 1940s), he developed an arsenal of additional pitches to complement his fastball: a dependable forkball, a slow curveball, and a changeup. Raffensberger had one of the widest ranges of deliveries in the major leagues, ranging from underhand to overhand and a variety of sidearm and three-quarter deliveries in between.
 
On November 10, 2002, Raffensberger died in his native York, Pennsylvania, at the age of 85.

Achievements
Made National League All-Star team (1944)
Twice led NL in shutouts (1949, five – 1952, six)
Led NL in games started (1949, 38)
Led NL in saves (1946, six)
Led NL in WHIP (1951, 1.086)
Led NL in SO to Walk (1944, 3.02)
3-time appeared in National League MVP vote (1949, 1951–52)
Twice led NL in losses (1944, 20 – 1951, 17)
Led NL in home runs allowed (1950, 34)
Led NL in hits allowed (1949, 289)

See also
 List of Major League Baseball annual saves leaders

References

Sources
Baseball Almanac
Ken Raffensberger - Baseballbiography.com

The Deadball Era
Historic Baseball
York Wiki

External links

Ken Raffensberger at SABR (Baseball BioProject)

1917 births
2002 deaths
Baseball players from Pennsylvania
Burlington Bees players
Cambridge Cardinals players
Chicago Cubs players
Cincinnati Redlegs players
Cincinnati Reds players
Havana Sugar Kings players
Lafayette Oilers players
Los Angeles Angels (minor league) players
Major League Baseball pitchers
Minor league baseball managers
National League All-Stars
Philadelphia Phillies players
Rochester Red Wings players
St. Louis Cardinals players
Sportspeople from York, Pennsylvania
York White Roses players
American expatriate baseball players in Cuba